Anett Dombai-Nagy is a Hungarian football striker currently playing for Astra Hungary in the Hungarian First Division. She previously played for László Kórház SC, Renova FC and 1.FC Femina, with which she also played the European Cup. She has been a member of the Hungarian national team for over 15 years; she made her debut in the 1997 European Championship qualifying's against Bulgaria.

References

1979 births
Living people
Hungarian women's footballers
Hungary women's international footballers
1. FC Femina players
László Kórház SC players
Renova players
Astra Hungary FC players
Women's association football forwards
Footballers from Budapest